Casper is a city in, and the county seat of, Natrona County, Wyoming, United States. Casper is the second-largest city in the state, with the population at 59,038 as of the 2020 census. Only Cheyenne, the state capital, is larger. Casper is nicknamed "The Oil City" and has a long history of oil boomtown and cowboy culture, dating back to the development of the nearby Salt Creek Oil Field.

Casper is located in east central Wyoming.

History
The city was established east of the former site of Fort Caspar, which was built during the mid-19th century mass migration of land seekers along the Oregon, California and Mormon trails. The area was the location of several ferries that offered passage across the North Platte River in the early 1840s. In 1859, Louis Guinard built a bridge and trading post near the original ferry locations.

The government soon posted a military garrison nearby to protect telegraph and mail service. It was under the command of Lieutenant Colonel William O. Collins. Native American attacks increased after the Sand Creek Massacre in Colorado in 1864, bringing more troops to the post, which was by now called Platte Bridge Station. In July 1865, Lieutenant Caspar Collins (the son of Colonel Collins) was killed near the post by a group of Indian warriors. Three months later the garrison was renamed Fort Caspar after Lieutenant Collins. In 1867, the troops were ordered to abandon Fort Caspar in favor of Fort Fetterman downstream on the North Platte along the Bozeman Trail.

The town of Casper itself was settled in 1887 and incorporated a year later, well after the fort had been closed. The city was founded by developers as an anticipated stopping point during the expansion of the Wyoming Central Railway; it was an early commercial rival to Bessemer and Douglas, Wyoming. The lack of a railhead doomed Bessemer in favor of Casper. Douglas, also a railhead, survives to the present day. The presence of a railhead made Casper the starting off point for the "invaders" in the Johnson County War. The special chartered train carrying the men up from Texas stopped at Casper. The town is named "Casper", instead of "Caspar", honoring the memory of Fort Caspar and Lt. Caspar Collins, due to a typo that occurred when the town's name was officially registered.

A site a few miles east was planned to be the original site of Casper, where a homesteader named Joshua Stroud lived prior to a station of the Chicago and North Western Railway being built. The site was laid out by the Pioneer Town Site Company in 1888 and was known as Strouds.

The city received a significant number of visitors during the solar eclipse of August 21, 2017, due to its position along the path of totality.

Geography

Interstate 25, which approaches Casper from the north and east, is the main avenue of transportation to and from the city. The towns immediately adjacent to Casper are Mills, Evansville, and Bar Nunn. Unincorporated areas include Allendale, Dempsey Acres, Red Buttes, Indian Springs, and several others.

Climate

Casper, as with most of the rest of Wyoming, has a continental semi-arid climate (Köppen climate classification BSk), with long, cold, but dry winters, hot but generally dry summers, mild springs, and short and crisp autumns. Snow can fall heavily during the winter and early to mid-spring months, and usually falls in May and October. Precipitation is greatest in spring and early summer, but even then it is not high. Highs reach  on 37.8 days per year and fail to surpass freezing on 41.3.

Demographics

2010 census
As of the census of 2010, there were 55,316 people, 22,794 households, and 14,237 families residing in the city. The racial makeup of the city was 92.3% White, 1.0% African American, 0.9% Native American, 0.8% Asian, 2.3% from other races, and 2.6% from two or more races. Hispanic or Latino people of any race were 7.4% of the population.

There were 22,794 households, of which 31.5% had children under the age of 18 living with them, 46.1% were married couples living together, 11.2% had a female householder with no husband present, 5.2% had a male householder with no wife present, and 37.5% were non-families. Of all households 30.3% were made up of individuals, and 10.1% had someone living alone who was 65 years of age or older. The average household size was 2.38 and the average family size was 2.95.

The median age in the city was 36 years. 23.9% of residents were under the age of 18; 10.2% were between the ages of 18 and 24; 26.7% were from 25 to 44; 26.4% were from 45 to 64; and 12.9% were 65 years of age or older. The gender makeup of the city was 49.7% male and 50.3% female.

2000 census
As of the census of 2000, there were 49,644 people, 20,343 households, and 13,141 families residing in the city. The population density was 2,073.2 people per square mile (800.3/km2). There were 21,872 housing units at an average density of 913.4 per square mile (352.6/km2). The racial makeup of the city was 94.03% White, 0.86% Black, 1.00% Native American, 0.49% Asian, 0.02% Pacific Islander, 2.04% from other races, and 1.56% from two or more races. 5.35% of the population were Hispanic or Latino of any race.

There were 20,343 households, out of which 31.8% had children under the age of 18 living with them, 49.6% were married couples living together, 11.1% had a female householder with no husband present, and 35.4% were non-families. Of all households 29.1% were made up of individuals, and 10.2% had someone living alone who was 65 years of age or older. The average household size was 2.38 and the average family size was 2.94.

In the city, the population was spread out, with 25.9% under the age of 18, 10.5% from 18 to 24, 27.7% from 25 to 44, 22.3% from 45 to 64, and 13.6% who were 65 years of age or older. The median age was 36 years. For every 100 females, there were 95.0 males. For every 100 females age 18 and over, there were 91.6 males.

The median income for a household in the city was $36,567, and the median income for a family was $46,267. Males had a median income of $34,905 versus $21,810 for females. The per capita income for the city was $19,409. About 8.5% of families and 11.4% of the population were below the poverty line, including 15.4% of those under age 18 and 7.3% of those age 65 or over.

Economy
Casper is a regional center of banking and commerce.

After the discovery of crude oil in the region during the 1890s, Casper became the regional petroleum industry center. Oil has figured prominently in its history from nearly the outset. The city has featured a refinery ever since, although various refineries have been built and closed over the years. As recently as the early 1980s, the city was near or home to three refineries. The surviving one, operated by Sinclair Oil Corporation, is located nearby in Evansville. Development of Wyoming coal and uranium fields in recent decades has helped Casper continue its role as a center in the energy industry.

Casper Wind Farm began operations near Casper in Natrona County and has 11 turbines with a generating capacity of 16.5 MW. Energy Transportation Inc. is headquartered in Casper. This logistics firm transports overweight and outsized components used in the wind power industry. The Casper landfill is also a disposal site for windmill blades.

Education
Casper is home to Casper College, a community college that offers bachelor's degrees in sixteen areas of study from the University of Wyoming through their UW/CC Center.

Public education in the city of Casper is provided by Natrona County School District #1. The district operates sixteen elementary schools, five middle schools, and three high schools in Casper. The high schools are Kelly Walsh, Natrona County, and Roosevelt High Schools. A program called CAPS is being added to Natrona County School District, which will provide more space and classrooms for juniors and seniors at the three high schools.

Casper has a public library, a branch of the Natrona County Public Library System.

Media
Casper is served by one print newspaper, the Casper Star-Tribune, a daily, and until recently the Casper Journal, published weekly. Casper is also home to WyoFile, an online publication focusing on state issues and Oil City News, an online news and media site.

Sports
UFC 6 took place at the Casper Events Center in 1995.
Casper hosted the AIFA Championship Bowl III at the Casper Events Center on July 26, 2009. 
The Events Center has hosted the College National Finals Rodeo since 2001.
The Casper Recreation Center offers basketball, fitness, racquetball, volleyball and is adjacent to the Casper Family Aquatics Center and Casper Ice Arena.
Soccer matches are held at the Casper Soccer Complex. 
The Casper Municipal Golf Course is a public 27-hole golf course in Casper.

Sports teams based in Casper include:
 Casper Cannibal RFC, an amateur rugby football team in the Eastern Rockies Rugby Football Union
 Casper Coyotes were a Junior A hockey team in the Western States Hockey League (WSHL) that played out of the Casper Ice Arena. They renamed to Casper Coyotes for the 2018–2019 season and folded before the 2019–2020 season.
 Casper Ghosts (formerly). From 2001 to 2011, Mike Lansing Field hosted the Ghosts of the Pioneer League, Rookie-level affiliate of the Colorado Rockies. In 2011, the team relocated to Grand Junction, Colorado to become the Rockies.
 Casper Horseheads, a collegiate summer baseball team of Independence League Baseball that started play in the summer of 2018, playing their home games at Mike Lansing Field.

Culture

Museums and historical sites

Casper is home to a number of museums and historical sites:
 Fort Caspar Museum and Historic Site
 National Historic Trails Interpretive Center, a federally funded and operated museum
 Nicolaysen Art Museum
 Tate Geological Museum at Casper College
 Werner Wildlife Museum
 Wyoming Veterans Memorial Museum
 The Science Zone
 Historic Bishop Home

Performing arts and music

Casper has three locations offering theater: the Gertrude Krampert Theatre at Casper College, Stage III Community Theatre, and the Casper Events Center where an annual series of touring Broadway shows, Broadway in Casper, can be seen.

Casper is home to the Troopers, a drum and bugle corps in Drum Corps International, and the Wyoming Symphony Orchestra. During the summer months, Casper's City Band performs free concerts Thursday evenings at Washington Park, weather permitting.

Architecture
Wyoming National Bank, a mid-century modern tower, was designed by Charles Deaton and is featured in Casper's logo.

Transportation

Highways
Interstate Highways:
  – North-South Interstate running from Las Cruces, New Mexico to Buffalo, Wyoming.

US Routes:
  – East–west route through Casper that runs concurrent with I-25 through Casper. At exit 189 the highway continues west out of Casper, and no longer runs concurrent with the interstate. The business route of US 20 follows N. Beverly St. and Yellowstone Hwy. going east–west from I-25/US 87 (Exit 186) to U.S. 20–26 west of Casper in Mills.
  – East–west route through Casper that runs concurrent with I-25 through Casper. At exit 189 the highway continues west out of Casper, and no longer runs concurrent with the interstate. The business route of US 26 follows N. McKinley St. and Yellowstone Hwy. going east–west from I-25/US 87 (Exit 187) to U.S. 20–26 west of Casper in Mills.
  – North-South through Casper that runs concurrent with I-25 through Casper.

Wyoming State Highways:
 (N. Poplar St., CY Avenue) – East–west route from I-25/US 87 (Exit 188B) west out of Casper towards Alcova.
 (Wolcott St., Casper Mountain Rd.) – North–south route that continues south out of Casper and up Casper Mountain, eventually ending at WYO 487.
 (S. Poplar St.) – North–south route from the intersection of Poplar Street and CY avenue to Casper Mountain Road.
 (Salt Creek Hwy.) – North–south route from I-25/US 87 south to US 20-26 (Yellowstone Hwy.) in Mills.
 (Center St., 9th St., CY Avenue) – North–south route from I-25 exit 188A to the intersection of S. Poplar and CY Avenue, where CY Avenue continues as WY 220.
 (Wyoming Blvd.) – East-West loop route from I-25/US 87 to US 20-26 west of Casper in Mills; the majority of the highway runs along the southern borders of Casper.

Airports
The city has scheduled air service at Casper–Natrona County International Airport, a former army air base built during World War II. The runways are large, having been built for bombers. It replaced a regional airport north of Casper which later became the town of Bar Nunn, Wyoming. The airport is located west of the city just off of US Highway 20/26. In July 2004, the airport facilities were renovated. Passenger service at the airport is offered by United Express (SkyWest Airlines and GoJet Airlines), and Delta Connection (SkyWest Airlines). FedEx Express and FedEx Feeder provide cargo airline service to the airport.

Public transit
Public transit in the Casper area had been provided by the Casper Area Transportation Coalition but is now offered by the city of Casper. They offer fixed route service called Casper Area LINK and an on-request service called ASSIST from Monday to Saturday.

Scheduled bus service
Scheduled bus service once offered by Power River Bus Lines is now offered by ExpressArrow (formerly Black Hills Stages).

Notable people
 Logan Wilson (born 1996), Linebacker for the Cincinnati Bengals
 John Barrasso (born 1952), Republican U.S. Senator from Wyoming
 Zane Beadles (born 1986), former Utah Ute offensive lineman; former member of the San Francisco 49ers
C. J. Box (born 1958), author
Tom Brewer (born 1958), member of the Nebraska Legislature
 Tom Browning (born 1960), former major league pitcher; threw perfect game; while with the Cincinnati Reds, won a World Series
Taven Bryan (born 1996), professional football player
 Dick Cheney (born 1941), US vice-president, Secretary of Defense; CEO of Halliburton Company; grew up in Casper
 Liz Cheney (born 1966), lawyer; member of U.S. State Department; daughter of Dick Cheney; attended elementary school in Casper; elected to the U.S. House of Representatives
 Lynne Cheney (born 1941), wife of former Vice President Dick Cheney
 Tom Coburn (1948–2020), U.S. Senator from Oklahoma
 Barbara Cubin (born 1946), former member of the U.S. House of Representatives; grew up and graduated from high school in Casper
 Mike Devereaux (born 1963), professional baseball player with World Series rings with Los Angeles Dodgers and Atlanta Braves
 Ron Franscell (born 1957), journalist, crime author
 Mary Meyer Gilmore (born 1947), former Democratic member of the Wyoming House of Representatives
 Rick Koerber (born 1973), convicted felon who was found guilty in federal court of orchestrating and running a $100 million Ponzi scheme  
 Marlan Scully (born 1939), physicist best known for his work in theoretical quantum optics
 Matthew Scully (born 1959), author, speechwriter
 Matthew Shepard (born 1976), murder victim for whom the Matthew Shepard Hate Crime Act is named
 Patrick Joseph Sullivan (1864–1935), mayor of Casper, Wyoming, 1897–1898; member of United States Senate from Wyoming, 1929–1930
 Floyd Volker (1921–1995), professional basketball player
 Pete Williams (born 1952), NBC News journalist covering the U.S. Justice Department

See also
List of municipalities in Wyoming

References

External links

 City website
 Casper Star-Tribune
 Casper Convention & Visitors Bureau
 Casper Area Chamber of Commerce
 Casper recreation

 
Cities in Wyoming
County seats in Wyoming
Cities in Natrona County, Wyoming
World War II Heritage Cities